This is a list of television broadcasters which provide coverage of the Campeonato Brasileiro Série A, Brazilian football's top-level competition.

Brazil

Outside Brazil

Brazil TV ratings

History

In 1987 
With only conveying the Green Module of the Copa União, organized by the Clube dos 13, the television rights were sold for $3.4 million to TV Globo.
And only with the conveying of the championship final, SBT broadcast the game instead, a blow to the TV Globo, who says today that the Green Module would be the league itself, and then was prevented from entering the Ilha do Retiro.
In 1989
Besides TV Globo, Rede Bandeirantes and Rede Manchete also took the rights to broadcast the matches.
In 1990
Only Rede Bandeirantes acquired the broadcast rights to the next season.
In 1994
The contract was negotiated for $6 million.
In 1995
League broadcasting rights was traded for $10.4 million.
In 1996
A new contract was signed for $15 million.

In 1997  
Began to be restricted games live in cities where the matches are held (except finals).
The Clube dos 13 closed the contract with TV Globo's television rights as the holder of the Brasileirão for $50 million (including editions of 1998 and 1999), and resolves itself split the rights with Rede Bandeirantes during this period.
It was the first edition to be shown on pay-per-view (vía Premiere)

In 2000 

TV Globo's broadcast for Copa João Havelange was negotiated for $50 million.
In 2001
The Clube dos 13 defines four divisions quota transmission. Group 1: Corinthians, São Paulo, Palmeiras, Flamengo and Vasco, Group 2: Santos, Group 3: Fluminense, Botafogo, Atlético Mineiro, Cruzeiro, Internacional and Grêmio; Group 4: Bahia, Goiás, Sport, Portuguesa, Coritiba, Atlético Paranaense, Bahia and Vitória.
In 2002
TV Globo back to resell its broadcasting rights to another station. This time it was TV Globo's rival, RecordTV, broadcasting the 2006 edition
In 2003
It expanded the TV contract to $130 million per year in the first issue disputed by points accrued.
In 2004
The championship will be broadcast by 120 countries.
In 2005
The C13 renews with TV Globo for the triennium season (2005–2008) by $300 million per year.
In 2007
After teaming up with RecordTV, Rede Bandeirantes returns to transmit up to 2010 edition
In 2009
For the first time, the rights were open bidding for the sale of broadcasting rights of the Brazilian Championship. All the media were invited to bid for TV packages open, closed, PPV, internet and broadcast abroad. TV Globo has signed the largest TV contract in history of Brazilian football for $1.4 billion in the editions of 2009, 2010 and 2011.
In 2011
On 23 February 2011, Corinthians required its disaffiliation of the Clube dos 13 for not agreeing with the way in which the entity was negotiating the rights to broadcast the League for the years 2012, 2013 and 2014 with various media communication stakeholders. The same goes to Botafogo on 25 March of the same year. Previously, the club, along with Flamengo, Fluminense and Vasco, had already announced that it would negotiate their broadcast rights directly, without mediation of Clube dos 13, position then later also by Coritiba and Cruzeiro and then Vitória, Santos, Goiás, Bahia and Sport.

 In 2020

Fanatiz announced the new partnership to broadcast both Brasileirão Serie A and B Championships globally outside of Brazil for both 2020 and 2021 seasons.

This is the first time since 2018, the Brasileirao will be available in full to its worldwide followers.

See also  
 List of Campeonato Brasileiro Série B broadcasters
 List of Campeonato Brasileiro Série C broadcasters

References

Broadcasters
Brasileiro Serie A Broadcasters
Association football on television
Brasileiro Serie A